Wojciech Kamiński (born 27 February 1974) is a Polish professional basketball coach.  Since 2020, he is the head coach of Legia Warszawa of the Polish Basketball League (PLK).

Career
Kamiński was appointed head coach of Rosa Radom in 2013. He led Rosa to the Polish Basketball Cup title in 2016. In 2015, he was named Coach of the Year in PLK.

On 12 June 2019, he was announced as head coach of Syntainics MBC of the German Basketball Bundesliga (BBL), where he replaced outgoing Silvano Poropat.
Further, he has been the assistant coach of Poland's national basketball team.

On 23 February 2020 he signed as head coach with Legia Warszawa of the Polish Basketball League (PLK).

Honors
PLK Best Coach: 2014–15

References

External links
Eurobasket.com Profile

1972 births
Living people
Basketball coaches
Mitteldeutscher BC coaches
Polish basketball coaches
Sportspeople from Warsaw